Girl of My Dreams is the debut full-length studio album by American singer-songwriter Fletcher, released on September 16, 2022, via Capitol Records.

Promotion

Four singles have been released from Girl of My Dreams: "Her Body Is Bible", "Becky's So Hot", "Sting" and "Better Version". A deluxe edition of the album was released on November 18, 2022, which was promoted by the single "Suckerpunch" as well as the previously released single, "Healing".

Critical reception

Girl of My Dreams received generally favorable reviews from critics. At Metacritic, which assigns a normalized rating out of 100 to reviews from professional publications, the album received a weighted average score of 73, indicating "generally favorable reviews".

Shannon Garner of Clash called the album a "chaotic, unfiltered project that unpacks and tackles insecurities head-on" and "an intense rollercoaster of supercharged pop but even in its painful moments, the record radiates an undeniable hope". Garner named Girl of My Dreams "Fletcher’s most revealing and revelatory body of work to date" which "solidifies her position as more than just a queer artist".

Writing for Pitchfork, Dani Blum was more critical, stating that Fletcher's songwriting on Girl of My Dreams "hides behind concerted confessions" and she "assigns clunky labels to her emotions without interrogating or even fully articulating them". Blum opined further that "there are shards of intriguing ideas buried in the album’s plodding acoustics and garish rock-pop confections, but Fletcher fails to excavate them" and derided the album's tracklist as a collection, concluding that "the women at the center of these songs are flat, blank spaces: The only concrete image she provides is a Taylor Swift shirt crumpled on an ex’s floor".

Track listing

Charts

References

External links
 

2022 debut albums
Albums produced by Malay (record producer)
Capitol Records albums
Fletcher (singer) albums